Sinopimoa is a monotypic genus of Chinese sheet weavers containing the single species, Sinopimoa bicolor. It was first described by S. Q. Li & J. Wunderlich in 2008, and is found in China. It was originally placed in its own family (Sinopimoidae) but is now considered a member of the Linyphiidae, and it may be a member of the Erigoninae.

See also
 List of Linyphiidae species (Q–Z)

References

Araneomorphae genera
Spiders of China
Linyphiidae